Su'ao Township, alternately romanized as Su-ao, is located in southern Yilan County, Taiwan, is an urban township that is famous for its seafood restaurants and cold springs. It is a terminus of National Highway No. 5, the Su'ao-Hualien Express Way, and the North-Link Line of the Taiwan Railway Administration. It also has two large harbors: Su'ao Port, a multi-function seaport that also houses a naval base; and Nanfang-ao Port, a major fishing port of Taiwan.

History

Japanese rule

Post-war
After World War II, the town was converted to a township under Taipei County. In 1950, the township was put under the newly established Yilan County.

Demographics
As of February 2023, Su'ao had 14,109 households and a total population of 37,804, including 19,877 females and 20,616 males. The population of Su'ao Town has been decreasing on average since 1981

Villages
The township comprises 26 villages: Aiding, Cunren, Dingliao, Gangbian, Longde, Nanan, Nancheng, Nanjian, Nanning, Nanqiang, Nanxing, Nanzheng, Shengai, Shenghu, Subei, Sunan, Sutung, Suxi, Tungao, Xincheng, Yongchun, Yongguang, Yongle, Yongrong, Zhangan and Zhaoyang.

Tourist attractions

 Nantian Temple
 Kailu Xianfengye Temple
 Baitul Muslimin Mosque
 Coral Museum
 Nanfang'ao Fishing Port
 Neipi Beach
 Su'ao Cold Spring
 Su'ao Fortress
 Tofu Cape
 Wulaokeng Scenic Area
 Zhu Dayu Culture Museum
 Bai Mi Wooden Clog Village

Climate

Transportation

 TRA Nan'ao Station
 TRA Su'ao Station
 TRA Su'aoxin Station
 TRA Xinma Station
 TRA Yongle Station
 Port of Su'ao

Notable people
 Chang Chen-yue, singer
 Cheng Jei-cheng, Minister of Education (2008-2009)
 Chang Yung-fa, founder of Evergreen Group

Gallery

References

External links

  

Port cities and towns in Taiwan
Townships in Yilan County, Taiwan